East Winona is an unincorporated community in Buffalo County, Wisconsin, United States, located where Canadian National Railway subsidiary Wisconsin Central Ltd.'s former Green Bay and Western Railroad line meets the BNSF Railway's St. Croix Subdivision. East Winona is located in the town of Buffalo.

Notes

Unincorporated communities in Wisconsin
Unincorporated communities in Buffalo County, Wisconsin
Former Chicago, Burlington and Quincy Railroad stations